Corona Records was a San Antonio-based label which helped establish the Tejano musical style.  It was formed by Manuel Rangel, Sr. Valerio Longoria made his first records for Corona in an electrical repair shop in 1947, which was also Corona's first release, and stayed for two years with several regional hits, before signing to Ideal Records.  Little Joe was signed to the label for a short time.  Lydia Mendoza recorded several titles for the label between 1955 and 1966.  The label recorded most San Antonio-based tejano artists of note, but the company kept no recording or sales ledgers.  The label released several hundreds of records, and was active into the 1970s.

References

Record labels established in 1947
Defunct record labels of the United States
Spanish-language music
Record labels based in Texas